Uzmi ili ostavi is a Serbian game show that started airing on May 7, 2007 on B92. It was the Serbian version of Endemol's Deal or No Deal, produced locally by Emotion.

Hosted by Milorad Manda Mandić, it had a running time of 45 minutes. The last episode aired on June 12, 2008 and the show has been off the air ever since. The show was scheduled to return sometime in 2009 as another 200 episodes had been ordered.

Format
There were 22 boxes each day. One contestant chooses their own box at the start of the game. The other 21 boxes are opened one by one as the value of the box is found out. At the same time, "the banker" offers a money prize to the contestant. The contestant decides will he take the bank deal (Uzmi - take it) or continue to play and eliminate boxes (Ostavi - leave it).

Prizes
Prizes go from as little as 1 RSD (about 1¢ US) to as big as 1,500,000 RSD (about US$15,900).

Croatia version 
Another show, with the same name, is the Croatian version of Deal or No Deal aired on HRT2 in 2006. Mirko Fodor and Mario Petrekovic are the hosts. There are 21 boxes, with the values range from 0.5kn to 500,000kn.

Prizes

References

External links
 Uzmi ili ostavi|Emotion Production

2007 Serbian television series debuts
2008 Serbian television series endings
Deal or No Deal
Serbian game shows
B92 original programming